Withernsea Lighthouse is an inland lighthouse that stands in the middle of the town of Withernsea in the East Riding of Yorkshire, England. The lighthouse stands 127 feet (38 m) high and took 18 months to build between 1892 and 1894. Formerly owned and run by Trinity House of London, it ceased operation on 1 July 1976 and is now used as a museum.

History
The lighthouse is a surprising distance (nearly ) from the sea front. At the time it was built, there was nothing between it and the sea but sand dunes, and fear of coastal erosion led to it being positioned well back. The lantern atop the tower and the Fresnel lens optic within it both came 'second-hand' from the old North Lighthouse at High Whitby, which had been decommissioned shortly before the building work at Withernsea began.

Initially, the light was provided by an eight-wick paraffin lamp, which was set within the fixed first-order catadioptric optic (which had been designed and manufactured by Chance Brothers in 1858). It was an occulting light, the lamp being eclipsed three times in quick succession every minute; the occulting mechanism was clockwork. A petroleum vapour lamp was introduced in the early 20th century; the triple-occulting arrangement remained in place until 1936.

Withernsea was the first lighthouse in the North of England to be converted from oil to electricity. It ran off mains electricity, but if the main lamp failed an automatic lamp changer brought a battery-powered lamp into action. This arrangement, provided by the Chloride Electrical Storage Company, was said to be 'the first electrical emergency lighting system to be adopted by Trinity House for a lighthouse'. A similar system was installed at Lowestoft two years later, and subsequently it was widely adopted across the service.

The lens weighed two tons and floated in a mercury bath; it was turned by clockwork. The lighting system, lens and clockwork mechanism remained in use into the 1970s. Before decommissioning in 1976, the lighthouse was operated as a 'man-and-wife station', run by a couple who were accommodated in the adjacent cottage.

Lighthouse today
The base of the lighthouse features RNLI and HM Coastguard exhibits, with models and old photographs. These record the history of ship-wrecks in the area and detail the Withernsea lifeboats and crews who saved 87 lives between 1862 and 1913. It also depicts the history of the nearby Spurn lifeboats.

The local history room has Victorian and Edwardian photos of the town including the pier and railway.

There is a Kay Kendall memorial to the 1950s film star, who was born in the town.

Views from the lamp room in the Withernsea Lighthouse are breathtaking, especially after climbing the 144 steps. There is no lamp, however, as this was removed after closure and sent to St Mary's Lighthouse in Tyne and Wear where it can still be seen to this day.

The lighthouse and adjoining lighthouse keepers' houses are now a Grade II listed building.

Gallery

See also

 List of lighthouses in England

References

External links

Withernsea Lighthouse
BBC Humber article by Dale Baxter

Lighthouses completed in 1894
Lighthouses in the East Riding of Yorkshire
Grade II listed buildings in the East Riding of Yorkshire
Grade II listed lighthouses
Holderness
Withernsea
Lighthouse museums in England
Museums in the East Riding of Yorkshire